Mettammal is a village in India, located in Trikaripur Panchayath in Kasaragod district in Kerala State.

Transportation
Local roads have access to NH.66 which connects to Mangalore in the north and Calicut in the south. The nearest railway station is Cheruvathur on Mangalore-Palakkad line. There are airports at Mangalore and Calicut.

References

Cheruvathur area

Shaik Umbayi METTAMMAL